Padampur is a Vidhan Sabha constituency of Bargarh district in Odisha State.
Area of this constituency includes Jharbandh, Paikmal and Padampur  (Rajborasambar) block.

Elected Members

16 elections held during 1951 to 2019. List of members elected from Padampur constituency are:

 1957: Bikramaditya Singh Bariha (Congress), and L M S Bariha (Ganatantra Parishad)
 1951: Aniruddha Mishra (Independent), and Lal Ranjit Singh Bariha (Congress)

Election results

2019
In 2019 election, Biju Janata Dal candidate Bijaya Ranjan Singh Bariha defeated Bharatiya Janata Party candidate Pradeep Purohit by a margin of 5,734 votes.

2014
In 2014 election, Bharatiya Janata Party candidate Pradip Purohit defeated Biju Janata Dal candidate Bijaya Ranjan Singha Bariha by a margin of 4,513 votes.

2009 
In 2009 election, Biju Janata Dal candidate Bijay Ranjan Singh Bariha defeated Indian National Congress candidate Satyabhusana Sahu by 18,066 votes.

Notes

References

Assembly constituencies of Odisha
Bargarh district